This is a list of athletic directors of the Nebraska Cornhuskers, which are the intercollegiate athletic teams that represent the University of Nebraska–Lincoln. The university is a member of the Big Ten Conference, and the Cornhuskers compete in NCAA Division I. Trev Alberts was appointed Nebraska's fifteenth full-time athletic director on July 14, 2021.

In its earliest days, the Nebraska Department of Athletics had no central figure serving as the head of the department or "athletic director", and the history of how this position developed is unclear. Early on, the head of the athletics department often had only a partial or part-time role and held other titles and responsibilities. The Athletics Department was governed by the "Athletic Board", composed of faculty members and other university officials. Sometimes, the person serving as the effective head of the Athletics Department served on this board and other times he did not. The first six heads of the Athletics Department held the title "Athletics Manager," first held by Raymond G. Clapp, NU's basketball coach and a professor of physical education. The first individual to hold the title "athletic director" was E. J. Stewart, who served from 1916 to 1919, while also coaching men's basketball and football during parts of his tenure. However, he is not considered Nebraska's first athletic director because it was not considered a full-time administrative position by the Board of Regents; this designation belong to Fred Luehring, who held the position from 1920 to 1922.

Many of Nebraska's athletic directors simultaneously coached one of the university's teams. These included basketball, baseball, and swimming, but the majority of dual-role administrators were football coaches: Stewart, Fred Dawson, Dana X. Bible, Biff Jones, Glenn Presnell, Adolph J. Lewandowski, George Clark, and Bob Devaney. NU's longest-serving athletic director was Devaney, who led the department from 1967 to 1992.

List of part-time athletic managers

List of athletic directors

Notes

References

Nebraska Cornhuskers athletic directors